The Chula–Thammasat or Thammasat–Chula Traditional Football Match (the name alternating, with the host's appearing first) is a football match between Chulalongkorn University and Thammasat University. It is held annually, usually in January, at the Suphachalasai Stadium in Bangkok, Thailand. Apart from the match itself (which is not played by strictly varsity teams, but include alumni), the event also focuses on card stunts performed by both sides' audiences, cheerleading, and the opening ceremony parades, of which Thammasat's politics-mocking sequence is an anticipated highlight. The event is regularly broadcast on national television.

History
 The match was started in 1934 by alumni of Suankularb Wittayalai School who were studying at both universities, intending it to be a varsity match in the likes of the British Oxford–Cambridge Boat Race. The first match was held on 4 December 1934 at the Sanam Luang field, with Thammasat University as the host. There was a ticket fee of 1 baht, the proceedings of which went to the Anti-tuberculosis Society of Thailand; after-expense earnings from the match have since traditionally been donated to charity.

The two universities alternate roles as hosts. From 1935 to 1937 the match was held at the Suankularb Wittayalai School football field, and since 1938 has been held at Suphachalasai Stadium (also known as the National Stadium), except in 1985, 1986, 1988 and 2008 when the match was held at the Chulalongkorn University Stadium. Starting in 1949, the Royal Cup has been awarded for the match.

The match has been cancelled several times, due to the flooding of Bangkok in 1942, World War II and its aftermath from 1944–1948, the Manhattan Rebellion in 1951, the aftermath of the 14 October 1973 uprising and the 6 October 1976 massacre in 1973–1975 and 1977, political crisis in 2014, and the death of King Bhumibol Adulyadej in 2017. The latest match, the 74th, was hosted by Chulalongkorn University and took place on 8 February 2020.

Results
Thammasat: 24 wins
Chulalongkorn: 18 wins
Draws: 32

See also
 Football in Thailand
 College rivalry

References

Football cup competitions in Thailand
Chulalongkorn University
Thammasat University
Recurring sporting events established in 1934
1934 establishments in Siam
Student sport in Thailand
Thai political satire